Mount Balungao is an inactive volcano located in Pangasinan, Ilocos Region, on the island of Luzon in the Philippines. It is the main tourist attraction of the town, along with the Balungao Hot and Cold Spring Resort nearby. Mount Balungao is listed as an inactive volcano by the Philippine Institute of Volcanology and Seismology (PHIVOLCS).

The volcano is located in the flat agricultural region, near the border of the Province of Nueva Ecija.

Listing
 List of inactive volcanoes in the Philippines

References

External links
 Municipality of Balungao official website

Inactive volcanoes of the Philippines
Landforms of Pangasinan